Sumol + Compal S.A. is a Portuguese food and beverages company specializing in soft drink production and bottling. The company's principal activities are the manufacturing, marketing, bottling, selling, exporting, and distribution of various types of beverages, such as soft drinks, juices, nectars, bottled water, beers, and other related products. It also has operations in the sectors of plastic and glass bottle manufacturing. Their brands include Sumol, Compal, Sucol, Tagus, Frize, Um Bongo and Água Serra da Estrela. 

It was founded in 2008 through the merger of Sumol (founded in 1945 as Refrigor) and Compal (founded in 1952), two leading Portuguese companies with a long history and a range of nationally prestigious brands.

Sumol + Compal operates in five continents. Its head office is in Carnaxide (Oeiras) and it has factories in Almeirim, Gouveia, Pombal, Vila Flor and Boane (Mozambique). António Pires de Lima and João Cotrim Figueiredo, members of the Portuguese parliament, are among the company's former CEOs throughout its history.

Products

Soft drinks
 Sumol
 Sumol Zero
 B!
 Blendz

Juices and nectars
 Compal Clássico
 Compal Light
 Compal Fresh
 Compal Vital
 Essential Compal
 Um Bongo
 Compal 100%

Water and beer
 Água Serra da Estrela (spring water)
 Frize (carbonated mineral water)
 Tagus (beer)

Canned vegetables and tomato
 Compal da Horta

Distribution brands
 Lipton Ice Tea (soft drink tea)
 PepsiCo soft drink products (exclusive Portuguese licensee)
 Estrella Damm (spanish beer)

External links
Official site

Food and drink companies established in 2008
Food and drink companies of Portugal
Portuguese companies established in 2008
PepsiCo bottlers
Soft drinks manufacturers